Marie-Élisabeth-Jeanne Simons Delatour (1750–1834) was a Belgian painter and engraver.

Born in Brussels, Delatour was sister-in-law of the painter Charles Leclercq; her son Alexandre Delatour also became a painter. Her brother was the painter Jean-Baptiste Simons, who became blind in 1786, whereupon she gave him some of her artwork including pastels. In 1817 she received a prize from the Antwerp Society for the Encouragement of the Fine Arts. A painter of interiors, she also produced miniatures.

References

1750 births
1834 deaths
Painters from the Austrian Netherlands
18th-century engravers
18th-century women artists
19th-century Belgian painters
19th-century engravers
19th-century Belgian women artists
Belgian women painters
Belgian engravers
Women engravers
Pastel artists
Artists from Brussels